John Hunt (? – June 15, 1827) was an American jurist.

Hunt was appointed to the Michigan Territorial Supreme Court on February 20, 1824 by President James Monroe and died in office on June 15, 1827.

Notes

External links
John Hunt, Michigan Supreme Court

Year of birth unknown
1827 deaths
Justices of the Michigan Supreme Court